Marmari (Katharevousa: Μαρμάριον) is a village and a former municipality in Euboea, Greece, in the southeastern end of the island. Since the 2011 local government reform it is part of the municipality Karystos, of which it is a municipal unit. Marmari has an area of 241.332 km2. The Greek National Road 44 (Chalkida - Karystos) runs through it and there are ferry routes with the mainland port of Rafina. The mountains dominate the east. Its main economy are local businesses and agriculture. Marmari is located southeast of Chalkida, east of Rafina and west of Karystos.

Other
Marmari currently has two schools: a middle school and a junior high school. It is surrounded by beautiful beaches which frequently host surfers from across the globe. Marmari is also home to Eastern Orthodox Christian churches. Marmari is also home to a post office, as well as many taverns. It is approximately one hour away from the port city of Rafina.

The area is a rich source of hard stones, with Karystos stone being one of the most popular. Their extraction and processing has been one of the oldest occupations of the inhabitants.

Sights of the area are: Saint George church and chrissi ammos (golden sand) beach. It is located across the island of Petalion and is a popular windsurfing or kitesurfing destination.
National Geographic magazine ranks Marmari between the top 10 best sailing destinations.

See also
List of settlements in the Euboea regional unit

References

External links
Homepage of Marmari (official website)
Marmari (Municipality) on GTP Travel Pages (in English and Greek)

Populated places in Euboea
Karystos